Pear Deck is an educational technology company offering a web-based application to K–12 schools and teachers. Pear Deck was founded in 2014 in Iowa City, Iowa. In December 2014, Pear Deck raised $500,000 in seed funding. The company was awarded the "New Startup of the Year" award at the Silicon Prairie Awards.

In 2015, Pear Deck was selected as the winner of the "Rise of Rest" competition by Steve Case. It was also selected as a "Top Ten School Tool" by EdSurge, and was a winner of the Village Capital: EdTech 2015 program.

In 2016, Pear Deck expanded its sales team to Kansas City.

In November 2020, Pear Deck merged with GoGuardian.

References

External links

Educational technology companies of the United States
American companies established in 2014